The 2000 CA-TennisTrophy was a men's tennis tournament played on indoor hard courts at the Wiener Stadthalle in Vienna, Austria and was part of the International Series Gold of the 2000 ATP Tour. It was the 26th edition of the tournament and was held from 9 October through 15 October 2000. Sixth-seeded Tim Henman won the singles title.

Finals

Singles

 Tim Henman defeated  Tommy Haas 6–4, 6–4, 6–4
 It was Henman's 1st title of the year and the 5th of his career.

Doubles

 Yevgeny Kafelnikov /  Nenad Zimonjić defeated  Jiří Novák /  David Rikl 6–4, 6–4
 It was Kafelnikov's 2nd title of the year and the 21st of his career. It was Zimonjić's 2nd title of the year and the 3rd of his career.

References

External links
 Official website
 ATP tournament profile
 ITF tournament edition details

CA-TennisTrophy
Vienna Open